Rumex andinus is a species of plant in the family Polygonaceae. It is endemic to Ecuador.

References

Endemic flora of Ecuador
andinus
Vulnerable plants
Taxonomy articles created by Polbot